Elm Park is a station on the abandoned North Shore Branch of the Staten Island Railway (SIR). The station is located in an open cut under the Bayonne Bridge approach in Elm Park, Staten Island, at Morningstar Road between Innis Street and Newark Avenue. It has two tracks and two side platforms.

History
The station opened on February 23, 1886, as a surface station. In the early 1930s as part of a grade crossing elimination project, the station was depressed into the current open-cut below grade level, and rebuilt with concrete platforms. Elm Park was closed on March 31, 1953, along with the South Beach Branch and the rest of the North Shore Branch.

It is one of the stations to be returned to operation under the proposals for reactivation of the North Shore branch for rapid transit, light rail, or bus rapid transit service.

Station layout

Exit stairs were located at the west end of the station towards Morningstar Road. An overpass from Eaton Place to Newark Avenue over the line (not connected to the station) was located at the station's east end under the Bayonne Bridge. East of the station past John Street, the line rises onto a concrete trestle built in 1935. 

Elm Park is one of several stations along the North Shore line still standing today, although the street staircases have been taken up and the former platforms are severely dilapidated, while the line's open cut is overgrown with vegetation. Only a single track — the St. George-bound track — remains, unelectrified and in ruins.

References

 https://web.archive.org/web/20150108175705/http://stationreporter.net/nshore.htm
 http://gretschviking.net/GOSIRTNorthShore.htm

North Shore Branch stations
Railway stations in the United States opened in 1886
Railway stations closed in 1953
1886 establishments in New York (state)
1953 disestablishments in New York (state)